The 1st Politburo of the Communist Party of Cuba (PCC) was elected in 1975 by the 1st Plenary Session of the 1st Central Committee, in the immediate aftermath of the 1st Party Congress.

Members

References

Specific

Bibliography

1st Politburo of the Communist Party of Cuba
1975 establishments in Cuba
1980 disestablishments in Cuba